A curandero (healer; f. A curandero is a specialist in traditional medicine whose practice can either contrast with or supplement that of a practitioner of Western medicine. A curandero is claimed to administer shamanistic and spiritistic remedies for mental, emotional, physical and "spiritual" illnesses. Some curanderos, such as Don Pedrito, the Healer of Los Olmos, make use of simple herbs, waters, or mud to allegedly effect their cures. Others add Catholic elements, such as holy water and pictures of saints; San Martin de Porres for example is heavily employed within Peruvian curanderismo. The use of Catholic prayers and other borrowings and lendings is often found alongside native religious elements. Still others, such as Maria Sabina, employ hallucinogenic media. Many curanderos emphasize their native spirituality in healing while being practicing Catholics. Most of the concepts related to curanderismo (the practice of curanderos) are words in Spanish language, often with Medieval, vernacular definitions.

History in Latin America
The term curanderos can be traced back to the Spanish colonization of Latin America. Curanderos in this part of the world are the result of the mixture of traditional Indigenous medicinal practices and Catholic rituals. There was also an influence from African rituals brought to Latin America by slaves. Curandero/a comes from the root curar in Spanish which literally translates to cure. Thus, a curandero/a is one who heals. Curanderos go beyond Western medicine, linking illness with evil spirits. This extends a curandero's duties to cover not only physical ailments but also psychological and interpersonal issues. Among the illnesses that Curandero/a's help with range from the mundane stomach ache to certain spiritual illnesses such as susto, mal de ojo, and even reversing black magic. Traditional communities see all of these issues as a loss of spirit. They believe that the curanderos can enter different dimensions where they are able to find the solutions to a person's illness or problem. Furthermore, they believe that God or the Higher Creator gives curanderos difficult and painful experiences so that they are better able to assist their patients. In Colonial Latin America, female folk healers, or curanderas, were often conflated with brujas (witches), which refers to those who cast spells; although curanderas were persecuted during such times, it is likely because they were females in positions of authority, not because of their healing methods. Today many women and men continue the curandero tradition in Mexico and the southwestern United States.

History in the United States
Historically, in the United States, curanderos were only found in concentrated Amerindian populations. It was largely thought that curanderos mainly practiced along the Mexico–United States border. However, recent historical research shows that the practice of curanderismo (traditional healing) was not restricted to the American Southwest. The practice of curanderismo was prevalent in the 1880s in Northeastern Tennessee.

In the mid- to late 1970s the rise in ethnic minority and immigrant populations grew in tandem with the public presence of curanderos in areas outside of the historical geographic regions of the United States which had large Indigenous populations. Since the 1990s, it has become more commonplace to see curanderos in northern-tier cities in the United States.

Types of Curanderos
There are many different types of curanderos. Yerberos are primarily herbalists. Hueseros are bone and muscle therapists who emphasize physical ailments. Parteras are midwives. oracionistas work primarily through the power of prayer. Other types include sobadors, who are masseurs, and brujos or brujas, who are witch doctors.

Among these broader terms, there are several subspecialties. For instance, yerberos who work primarily with tobacco to heal patients are known as tabaqueros. Healers who work primarily with ayahuasca are known as ayahuasqueros. Healers who work with peyote are known as peyoteros.

Although many curanderos do have a specialty and may identify with it, that does not mean that these healing modalities are necessarily strict and do not overlap. As an example, an oracionista may also be a yerbera, and so on.

Practices of Curanderos
Hispanics might seek out curanderos if the properties of their bodies are "hot" and "cold". Most of these practicing curanderos do not have formal medical training and inherit their gift or learn through being an apprentice. Often these faith healers have no office and work out of their homes. A significant factor why Hispanics seek out help from a curandero is because it is more affordable. Western medicine can often be more expensive, and some Hispanic families do not have the resources needed to be able to pay for them. Depending on the curandero, they might not charge for their services or just ask for a small offering or fee. You can find them in Hispanic communities to allow the members more accessibility to their services. Other reasons these communities might seek out services offered by curanderos are the language barrier and their immigration status. Curanderos are found in Spanish communities and can communicate better about their diagnoses and treatment. Unlike hospitals or healthcare workers that might have difficulty with a language barrier and complex medical terminology. 

Communicating correctly to your patients is essential, but it is even more challenging if you do not speak the language or do not have an interpreter. As for their immigration status, it can be challenging to get health care from government support, especially for undocumented. Many of these Latinos will pay in cash for health care services they do receive out of fear of getting their immigration status reported.

Curanderos and at-home remedies come as an advantage to these individuals if they cannot pay cash but will do so if things get severe and do not better with other remedies first. Considering that these practices align more with Hispanic cultural views and beliefs, many of these individuals used curanderos and traditional medicine or alternative medicine in their home country. It can also be seen as a way of preserving these cultural views. Spiritual healing is another reason why curanderos might be seeking out, and Hispanics feel that medical providers cannot help heal spiritual issues that the body might deal with.

Clients find that curanderos are healers of both the body and spirit. If needed, a curandero can cast out the evil spirits that might reside in someone's body and do a full spiritual cleanse. This is stuff that you will not find your medical provider doing or trying to achieve. It is found that most Hispanics who seek curanderos for their services are born in their home country as opposed to Hispanics born in the United States. Hispanics who are less integrated into life in the United States seek these healers to connect and feel familiar with their home countries' traditionalism. These Hispanic community members can be dissatisfied with diagnoses or Western medicine practices. They feel that their provider does not believe in their folk illnesses, much less know how to approach and treat them.

Traditional Illnesses and Maladies
Among some of the illnesses that curanderos treat are: espanto ("scare") or susto ("fright");  detaching or warding off vampiric espiritus (spirits); defending against or negating brujeria ("witchcraft" or "sorcery"), such as mal de ojo ("evil eye") or other ill intent; clearing illnesses associated with mal aire or mal viento ("evil air" or "evil wind"); treating mal projimo ("bad neighbor"), an illness caused by having negative thoughts or feelings towards another individual, or conversely, a group of people feeling negatively towards the patient being treated, both of which can lead to harm to the individual.

Consequences of Encounters with Duendes
A curandero can treat the negative consequences of encounters a person has had had with a duende (a "spirit creature" such as a pixie, imp, fairy, leprechaun, brownie, dwarf, gnome, or troll. A duende can be a beneficial, neutral, or malicious spirit. Duendes are believed to live in the countryside of Latin American countries.

Effects of Mal aire or mal viento
Mal aire or mal viento is something invisible movements of the air are believed to cause. These can be defined as the result of "bad" or "evil" air or an illness caused by hot or cold air. For example, if a person is  outside on a hot day but enters a much cooler building, they can catch an aire. This can also be caused by supernatural forces carried through the wind. Something can be caught by walking around or encountering places with bad energy. Examples of such places can be graveyards, abandoned houses, and other places where these "bad" forces reside. The harmful energy attaches itself to a person when such forces are encountered and can quickly takes over their entire body. It is believed that this harmful energy can also result in the decaying of a person's internal organs and can be fatal if left untreated. Many other common symptoms of mal aire include headaches, nausea, fatigue, diarrhea, and paleness.

Soul Loss
A person can "lose their soul" (also known as soul loss) when being frightened or experiencing a frightening experience. This is called espanto or susto. Usually, susto has much milder symptoms, and children and babies are more prone to getting in regarding this illness. Examples of such experiences that can cause this is having scary dreams, receiving devastating news, facing a wild animal, etc. Symptoms associated with this disease can be nausea, crying, bad dreams, and insomnia.

For all of the illnesses mentioned above, a curandero can perform a mal limpieza ("purge of evil" or "cleansing of evil") in order to get rid of the "bad" and restore the client to health. Examples of materials used in these limpizas are sugar, liquor, holy water, perfume, eggs, chickens, and Guinea pigs. Others include a dog's skull, a dove's blood, and a head from a doll, or some other power object. Limpieza can also be performed with plants. These magical plants can be helpful in cleaning houses as well. If a house has been abandoned or something terrible has happened in it, such as a sudden death or act of violence, a curandero will do a ritual that cleanses the home from all the mal ("evil"). Once a limpieza has occurred, the materials used in it are disposed of. Given that the mal has been transferred to them, the must be disposed of far from human inhabitants in order to prevent others being harmed.

Further information
In the 21st century as the popularity of alternative medicines grow, some curanderos are concerned about the appropriation of these practices.

The Moche people of ancient Peru often depicted curanderos in their art.

In the Andes, one of the instruments of the curandero is the chonta, a lance carved from the chonta palm, Bactris gasipaes, thought to be imbued with magical powers. The palm grows only in the Amazon basin and is the object of a brisk commerce. The Jivaro people of the Amazon Rainforest use the hardwood of the chonta to carve their spears. The shaman is also known as chonteador, and his most important wand is the chonta defensa; if he dies without disciples, the chonta is thrown, wrapped in rubands and weighted with stones, to the bottom of a lake with the belief that its power will reemerge when a new shaman will take office. The shamans also use wands of huatulco wood, Loxopterygium huasango.

In fiction 
Curanderos, probably because of the mystery and intrigue that surrounds them, are frequently included in fictional works:
 César Calvo, Las Tres Mitades de Ino Moxo y otros brujos de la Amazonías (Iquitos 1981), translated as The Three Halves of Ino Moxo. Teachings of the Wizard of the Upper Amazon. A novel by the Peruvian author based on the life of Manuel Córdova-Rios.
 Bless Me, Ultima, by the Chicano author Rudolfo Anaya.
 The original screenplay for the film Viva Zapata! involved a curandera predicting the birth and death of Mexican revolutionary Emiliano Zapata. The original played much more heavily on the supernatural than the chosen script.
 Curandero, a 2005 film by Eduardo Rodríguez.
 Changes for Josefina, one of the American Girl series of books about 10-year-old Maria Josefina Montoya set outside Santa Fe in the mid-1820s, features Tía Magdalena as a curandera and the most respected woman in the protagonist's village. She is also featured in the American Girl novel Secrets in the Hills.
 Forests of the Heart by Charles de Lint features a curandera protagonist.
 So Far from God, by Chicana author Ana Castillo, features the curandera character Doña Felicia.
 (Notes from the Trial of) La Curandera, a song by the band Clutch off their 2004 album Blast Tyrant. It features a fictional trial of a curandera for curing a demon.
 Nightmare by Joan Lowery Nixon
 The Hummingbird's Daughter by Luis Alberto Urrea tells the story of Teresita Urrea, a curandera at the end of the 1800s.
 The House of the Scorpion by Nancy Farmer features a character named Celia who is a curandera.
 Dark Obsession by Terri Molina features a character named Ramon Chavez who is warned of danger by the spirit of a curandera, and contains a healing experience based on real life.
 The Codex by Douglas Preston features two curanderos: Don Alfonso Boswas and Borabay. A North American character, Sally Colorado, is also honoured with the nickname Curandera.
 In the Medical Center (TV series) episode 'Tio Taco', Dr. Joe Gannon confronts Mondragon, a curandero who tries to treat a woman with an internal hemorrhage.
 Marta's Ride by Gordon Rottman mentions curanderas attempting to save a possessed man.
 "La Bruja" , a short story by Derek Hawke, tells the story of a good Curandera who is betrayed by the town she serves and condemned as a bruja. She makes a dark pact to take revenge on the townspeople who sentenced her to death.
The Terror: Infamy features a curandera during segments set in New Mexico in the 1940s.
The Case of the Toxic Spell Dump by Harry Turtledove includes a curandero named Cuauhtémoc Hernandez.
The Curse of La Llorona (2019 film) features a curandero (played by Raymond Cruz) who fights the titular spirit of the "weeping woman".

In other works 
 Woman Who Glows in the Dark: A Curandera Reveals Traditional Aztec Secrets of Physical and Spiritual Health (2000), by Elena Avila
 Eduardo The Healer is a documentary that follows the life of a Peruvian curandero.
 The life and writing of Don Miguel Ruiz has been also influenced by curanderismo; his mother was a curandera.
 Women who Run with the Wolves: Myths and Stories of the Wild Woman Archetype (1992), by Clarissa Pinkola Estés

See also

 Aztec medicine
 Guillermo Arévalo
 Pablo Amaringo
 Benedicaria
 Carlos Castaneda
 Folk healer
 Kalku
 Machi (shaman)
 Maya medicine
 Medicine man
 Nganga
 María Sabina
 Plastic shaman
 Santería
 Shamanism
 Shipibo-Conibo people
 Witch doctor

Notes

References
 Karsten, Rafael. Blood, Revenge, War and Victory Feasts Among the Jibara Indians of Eastern Ecuador. Kessinger Publishing, LLC, 2004. .
 Beyer, Stephan V. (2009). Singing to the Plants: A Guide to Mestizo Shamanism in the Upper Amazon. University of New Mexico Press
Favazza Titus, Sharon K. "Seeking and Utilizing a Curandero in the United States." Journal of Holistic Nursing, vol. 32, no. 3, 2014, pp. 189–201.

Further reading
 Riding, Alan. Distant Neighbors: A Portrait of the Mexicans. New York: Vintage, 2000.
 Trotter, Robert T. II, and Juan Antonio Chavira.  Curanderismo: Mexican American Folk Healing (Second ed.). University of Georgia Press, October 1997.
Cavender, Anthony P, and Manuel Albán. "The Use of Magical Plants by Curanderos in the Ecuador Highlands." Journal of Ethnobiology and Ethnomedicine, 2009, p. 9.
Avila, Elena, and Joy Parker. “Woman Who Glows In The Dark. A Curandera Reveals Traditional Aztec Secrets of Physical and Spiritual Health” ISBN 0-87477-958-8 1999.

Catholic culture
Christianity and religious syncretism
Latin American folklore
Mexican Spanish
Shamanism of the Americas
Supernatural healing
Traditional healthcare occupations